Ferdinand Dörfler (born 18 December 1903 in Munich, died 4 June 1965) was a German screenwriter and film director.

Selected filmography
 Everything for the Company (1950)
 The Midnight Venus (1951)
 Monks, Girls and Hungarian Soldiers (1952)
 The Night Without Morals (1953)
 The Sinful Village (1954)
 Der Frontgockel (1955)
 Besuch aus heiterem Himmel (1959)
 The Double Husband (1955)

References

External links

1903 births
1965 deaths
Film people from Munich